"Don't You Think This Outlaw Bit's Done Got Out of Hand" is a song written and recorded by American country music artist Waylon Jennings. It released in October 1978 as the second single from his album I've Always Been Crazy.  The song peaked at number 5 on the Billboard Hot Country Singles chart. It also reached number 1 on the RPM Country Tracks chart in Canada.

Content
The song is based on Jennings's own longstanding drug habit, which culminated in a 1977 arrest on federal drug charges in which a package from New York City was traced to a studio in Nashville, Tennessee. DEA agents busted down the door to find longtime drummer for Jennings and producer for the album Richie Albright at the control board and immediately questioned him. Albright put his hand on the talkback button of the control board to let Jennings hear what was happening. Jennings hid the package, then examined the arrest warrant which was faulty, with the wrong owner listed. With the agents distracted, Albright flushed the cocaine down a toilet.

Chart performance

Cover versions
Waylon's son Shooter Jennings performed a cover of this song on CMT Crossroads as a duet with Jamey Johnson.

On the tribute album I've Always Been Crazy: Tribute to Waylon Jennings, the song was covered by Metallica frontman James Hetfield.

References

Songs about drugs
1978 singles
1978 songs
Waylon Jennings songs
Songs written by Waylon Jennings
RCA Records singles